Jens Högbom (born March 1, 1995) is a Swedish ice hockey defenceman. He is currently playing with Luleå HF of the Swedish Hockey League (SHL).

Högbom made his Swedish Hockey League debut playing with Luleå HF during the 2013–14 season.

References

External links

1995 births
Living people
Luleå HF players
Swedish ice hockey defencemen
Sportspeople from Umeå